Barun may refer to:
 Barun, India
 Barun, Iran
 Barun Valley, Nepal